The Iron Triangle is a 1989 film about the Vietnam War shot in Sri Lanka and directed by Eric Weston.

The story is based on the diary of an unknown Viet Cong Soldier. This unique fact gives the movie a different perspective than many of the other movies about the Vietnam war and makes black and white distinctions about who were the "good guys" and "bad guys" a little more complicated. The film stars Beau Bridges, Haing S. Ngor, Liem Whatley, Johnny Hallyday, Jim Ishida, and Ping Wu. Each character helps bring to life the struggle of what it means to fight for one's country. Whether they be a teacher's son (Ho), a French mercenary (Jacques), or a simple soldier (Keene) these three men bring to light a gray view of war which reflects that there are many sides to the war than just "good" or "evil".

Cast
 Beau Bridges as Captain Keene, U.S. Army
 Liem Whatly as Ho, young Viet Cong soldier
 Haing S. Ngor as Colonel Tuong, NVA
 Johnny Hallyday as Jacques, French soldier/guard
 François Chau as Captain Duc
 Jim Ishida as Khoi, upper level Viet Cong soldier
 Ping Wu as Pham, Ho's best friend and young Viet Cong soldier

References

External links
 
 

1989 films
Vietnam War films
1980s war films
Films shot in Sri Lanka
Films based on diaries
War films based on actual events
1980s English-language films
American war films
American films based on actual events
1980s American films